¡Ay Caramba! is the second studio album by English group Ska Cubano, released on 4 July 2005 by Casinosounds. It was released in the US by independent label Cumbancha. The album mixes Jamaican ska, Afro-Cuban son, retro swing, salsa and Colombian cumbia.

Critical reception
Steve Hands of musicOMH wrote that the album "possesses the grainy authenticism of goodtimey Ska, just before the euphoria of Jamaican independence subsided, full of tall tales, late-nite shebeens, rum, and rhumba". Brent Hagerman of Exclaim! called the album "a pan-Caribbean jam from the early '60s that never had a chance to happen since the Cuban revolution largely cut off musical ties between Cuba and the rest of the Caribbean".

Track listing

References

External links
 

Ska Cubano albums
2005 albums